The thirteenth series of Warsaw Shore, a Polish television programme based in Warsaw, Poland was announced in January 2020. The series was scheduled to premiere on 29 March 2020, but was postponed due to the COVID-19 pandemic and rescheduled to another date. The new start date was 6 September 2020 and episodes began airing on Sunday and Wednesday. Ahead of the series it was announced that new cast members Milena Łaszek and Marceli Szklanny had joined the series. This is the first series not to include original cast members Anna "Mała" Aleksandrzak and Damian "Stifler" Zduńczyk, who had quit the show after the previous series. The series also featured the return of Damian "Dzik" Graf. Nathan Henry participant of Geordie Shore had a special participation during episodes eleven and twelve, it is the first time that a participant of said program is part of Warsaw Shore after the first season.

Cast 
 Anastasiya Yandaltsava
 Damian "Dzik" Graf
 Radosław "Diva" Majchrowski
 Ewa Piekut
 Ewelina Kubiak
 Gábor "Gabo" Szabó
 Joanna Bałdys
 Kasjusz "Don Kasjo" Życiński
 Marceli Szklanny
 Milena Łaszek
 Patryk Spiker
 Piotr Polak

Special guest 

 Nathan Henry (Episodes 11–12)

Duration of cast

Notes 

 Key:  = "Cast member" is featured in this episode.
 Key:  = "Cast member" arrives in the house.
 Key:  = "Cast member" leaves and returns to the house in the same episode.
 Key:  = "Cast member" returns to the series.
 Key:  = "Cast member" leaves the series.

Episodes

References 

2020 Polish television seasons
Series 13
Television productions suspended due to the COVID-19 pandemic